Hicham Dmiai (born 11 January 1971) is a Moroccan former footballer. He competed in the 1992 Summer Olympics.

References

External links
 
 
 

1971 births
Living people
Moroccan footballers
Morocco international footballers
Olympic footballers of Morocco
Footballers at the 1992 Summer Olympics
Place of birth missing (living people)
Association football midfielders
Kawkab Marrakech players